Juan Espinoza may refer to:

 Juan Carlos Espinoza (Honduran footballer) (born 1958), Honduran football midfielder and football manager
 Juan Espinoza (Ecuadorian footballer) (born 1987), Ecuadorian football centre-back
 Juan Carlos Espinoza (Chilean footballer) (born 1991), Chilean football right-back
 Juan Espinoza Medrano District, district in the province of Antabamba, Peru